Stumptown is an American crime drama television series that premiered on ABC on September 25, 2019. The series is based on the comic book series of the same name, created by Greg Rucka, Matthew Southworth and Justin Greenwood and adapted for television by writer-producer Jason Richman. The title Stumptown is a nickname for the city of Portland, where the series is set. In October 2019, ABC issued a full season order.

In May 2020, the series was renewed for a second season. In September 2020, it was announced that ABC had canceled the renewal decision and canceled the series after one season, as production delays caused by the COVID-19 pandemic meant the series hadn't got ready until April 2021. ABC Studios was reported as trying to sell the series to another network or streaming site.

Premise
Dex Parios (Cobie Smulders) is a sharp-witted military veteran, who struggles to get by and take care of her younger brother Ansel (Cole Sibus), in Portland, Oregon. She also struggles with PTSD from her time as a Marine in Afghanistan, where she worked in military intelligence until she was injured by an explosion which killed her college sweetheart and former lover. Burdened by heavy gambling debts and unable to hold down a steady job, she becomes a private investigator to solve problems where the police aren't getting involved. Detective Miles Hoffman (Michael Ealy) refers problems to her, and Grey McConnell (Jake Johnson), a bar owner and Dex's closest friend, provides moral support and employs her brother Ansel at his bar.

Cast and characters

Main

 Cobie Smulders as Dex Parios, a Marine veteran who now works as a private investigator to support her brother and dig her way out of debt
 Jake Johnson as Grey McConnell, an ex-con, owner of the Bad Alibi bar, and Dex's closest friend
 Tantoo Cardinal as Sue Lynn Blackbird, Native from the Confederated Tribes who is the owner of a tribal casino and mother of Dex's deceased boyfriend
 Cole Sibus as Ansel Parios, Dex's brother who has Down syndrome and works as a bar-back at the Bad Alibi
 Adrian Martinez as Tookie, a food truck owner who serves as an informant for Dex
 Camryn Manheim as Lieutenant Cosgrove, Detective Hoffman's supervisor
 Michael Ealy as Detective Miles Hoffman, Dex's contact at the Portland Police Bureau

Recurring

 Gregory Zaragoza as Hollis Green, Sue Lynn Blackbird's right-hand man
 Monica Barbaro as Liz Melero, a bartender at the Bad Alibi who also dated Grey
 Fiona Rene as Detective Kara Lee, Hoffman's partner
 Selwyn Huqueriza as Victor, Tookie's assistant chef
 Chuck Filipov as Scuzzy, the point man for an auto theft ring
 Tommy O'Brien as Charles "Chaz" Wyatt, a car thief who works with Scuzzy

Guest

 Inbar Lavi as Max, a mechanic and member of the auto theft ring who wants to get out of it. She forms a romantic relationship with Grey.
 Robert Adamson as Jeremy Stevens, a vet who befriends Dex after she helps him find his birth family.
 Cynthia Addai-Robinson as "Violet", an assassin sent to reclaim the drugs stolen by Leo's crew
 Troian Bellisario as Jenna Marshall, a prospective bride whose fiancé Dex is hired to investigate
 Steven Williams as Lionel Hoffman, Miles' father, a prominent local defense attorney, whom Miles is estranged from.
 Denise Dowse as Mrs. Hoffman, Miles' mother
 Matt Craven as Michael McConnell, Grey's father who abandoned him many years before
 Román Zaragoza as Hollis Green's nephew.
 Julie Goldman as Poppy Williams

Production

Development
On January 29, 2019, it was announced that ABC had given the production a pilot order. The pilot was written by Jason Richman who executive produces along with Ruben Fleischer, Dave Bernad, Greg Rucka, Matthew Southworth and Justin Greenwood. Production companies involved with the pilot include The District and ABC Studios. On May 8, 2019, it was announced that the production had been given a series order. A day after that, it was announced that the series would premiere in the fall of 2019 and air on Wednesdays at 10:00 P.M. The series premiered on September 25, 2019. On October 28, 2019, the series received a full season order.

Casting
In February 2019, it was announced that Cobie Smulders had been cast in the pilot's lead role. Alongside the series order announcement, it was reported that Michael Ealy, Mark Webber and Camryn Manheim had joined the cast in starring roles. On May 11, 2019, it was reported that Webber, who was originally cast to play the male lead opposite Smulders in the series, had exited and his role would be recast. On May 29, 2019, Jake Johnson was cast as Grey McConnell, replacing Webber.

At the 2019 San Diego Comic Con preview of the pilot, Cobie Smulders confirmed that Dex's bisexuality would "definitely be addressed in the series". Smulders described Dex as "definitely attracted to women and men ... she tries to recover from her PTSD through sex. She's up for anything — it's one of the things that drew me to this character."

Filming
Although set in Portland, the series is filmed in Los Angeles. However, the pilot episode, filmed mostly in Vancouver, B.C., included a few scenes shot in Portland.

Cancellation
On May 21, 2020, ABC renewed the series for a second season. On July 25, 2020, Monica Owusu-Breen joined the series as an executive producer for the second season. On September 16, 2020, it was announced that production delays, caused by the ongoing COVID-19 pandemic, meant the series would not be ready in time, effectively canceling the series. ABC Studios shopped the series. According to Deadline Hollywood, production had not yet started, the change of showrunner would also have delayed scripts and the show would not have been ready until April 2021.

Episodes

Release

Marketing
On May 14, 2019, ABC released the first official trailer for the series.

Reception

Critical response
The review aggregation website Rotten Tomatoes reported a 92% approval rating with an average rating of 7.56/10, based on 38 reviews. The website's critical consensus reads, "Simple, but strong, Stumptown moves at a brisk pace and packs a serious punch thanks in large part to Cobie Smulders' star making performance." On Metacritic, the series has a weighted average score of 73 out of 100 based on reviews from 16 critics, indicating "generally favorable reviews".

Caroline Framke of Variety wrote: "With only one episode to go on, it’s hard to say how “Stumptown” will handle its upcoming cases of the week, or if it will shade Dex out beyond her clichéd basics. But there are a couple standout elements of the show that point towards a more promising season than not." Allison Shoemaker of The A.V. Club reviewed the first episode and wrote:
"It’s likely that this origin story will lead to Dex getting a new case/distraction of the week; hopefully, those stories will stand on their own as much as they illuminate her inner life. Even if it doesn’t, even if life for Stumptown becomes a lot less interesting after this first trip, Cobie Smulders, and Dex Parios, are well worth visiting again."
Mike Hale of The New York Times wrote: "There's a potentially appealing mix of wisecracking humor and underplayed, credible action, though, that could blossom if it's given precedence over the melodramatic back story.

Ratings

References

External links
 
 

2010s American crime drama television series
2010s American LGBT-related drama television series
2019 American television series debuts
2020 American television series endings
2020s American crime drama television series
2020s American LGBT-related drama television series
American action television series
American Broadcasting Company original programming
American detective television series
Bisexuality-related television series
Down syndrome in television
English-language television shows
Fictional portrayals of the Portland Police Bureau
Oni Press adaptations
Television productions cancelled due to the COVID-19 pandemic
Television series by ABC Studios
Television shows based on comics
Television shows set in Portland, Oregon